The Hooper Crags are a rocky spur  long, lying at the south side of Foster Glacier in the Royal Society Range of Antarctica. The feature was named by the Advisory Committee on Antarctic Names in 1963 for Lieutenant Benjamin F. Hooper, a helicopter pilot with U.S. Navy Squadron VX-6, who wintered at McMurdo Station in 1960.

References

Cliffs of Victoria Land
Scott Coast